Basic Black 2 is a dye of the azine class that is soluble in water.  The dye is mostly made to obtain black and green. In water, dark green and light blue might be viewed. In ethanol, red light blue can be observed.

References 

Azin dyes
Diethylamino compounds